A high roller is a gambler who wagers large amounts of money.

High Roller or Highroller may also refer to:

Amusement rides
 High Roller (Ferris wheel), on the Las Vegas Strip, Nevada, US
 High Roller (Stratosphere), a steel roller coaster atop Stratosphere Tower, Las Vegas, Nevada, US, from 1996 to 2005
 High Roller (Valleyfair), a wooden roller coaster at Shakopee, Minnesota, US, built in 1976

Film and television
 High Roller: The Stu Ungar Story, a 2003 American biopic
 The Con Artists (1976 film), also known as High Rollers, a 1976 crime-comedy film
 High Rollers, an American TV game show based on the dice game Shut the Box
 Highroller, a fictional character in the German comedy-drama TV series Jabhook

Games
 Crazy Taxi 3: High Roller, a 2002 Sega electronic video game

Music
 High Roller (album), released in 1974 by James Montgomery
 "High Roller" (Cheap Trick song), from the 1978 album Heaven Tonight
 "High Roller" (The Crystal Method song), from the 1997 album Vegas
 "High Roller" (Pegboard Nerds), from the 2013 album Guilty Pleasures EP
 "High Rollers" (song) by Ice-T, from the 1988 album Power

Roller derby leagues
 Ark Valley High Rollers, based in Salida, Colorado, US
 Lowcountry Highrollers, based in Charleston, South Carolina, US

Others
Operation High Roller, bank fraud cyberattack